Sergey Victorovich Ulyanov was born on 5 December 1946 in Engels, Saratov region, USSR.

Biography 
 1971 — graduated from Bauman Moscow State Technical University on the specialty Electro-Mechanical Engineering and Automation Control Systems;
 1974 — got PhD from the Central Institute of Building Construction (Moscow) on the specialty Dynamic of Building Construction on Earthquake Excitations;
 1992 — got State Dr. of Physics and Mathematics Sciences from the Institute of Physical and Technical Problems (Moscow) on the specialty Quantum and Relativistic Dynamic Control Systems;
 1974 — 1992 prof. at Moscow State Institute of Radio-engineering Electronics and Automation;
 1993 — 1996 prof. at University of Electro-Communications(Japan);
 1996 — 2007 worked at Yamaha Motor Company(in Tokyo and Milan offices);
 1998 — 2003 prof. at University of Milan (Milan);
 Since 2007 — prof. at International University of Nature, Society and Man (Dubna);
 Since 2009 — alternate president of Science park of Dubna;
 Since 2010 — science project manager in company PronetLabs.

Scientific interests 
Research Interests: Intelligent control systems by complex random systems with variable structure; intelligent toolkit for robotics, fuzzy controllers; hardware and software for fuzzy controllers; intelligent mechatronics; biotechnology; face recognition system; quantum and relativistic control system; soft computing; quantum algorithms and quantum soft computing.
He is the member of Editorial board in many International Journals as Soft Computing, Journal of Robotics and Mechatronics, Journal of Advanced Computational Intelligence, Biomedical Engineering; chairman of many sections in International conferences; scientific coordinator of International projects between United States, Italy, Japan and Russia.

Worked with: Lotfi A. Zadeh, B. N. Petrov, Rafig Aliyev and other.

Industrial activities
 designed fuzzy control system for mobile robots and manipulators in Institute of Physical and Technical Problems (Moscow) and in University of Electro-Communications;
 assisted to the develop electro-pneumatic PID-controllers on Integrated circuit for Intelligent systems wall climbing robot for the decontamination of Chernobyl nuclear-power plant, painting, fire-fighting operations;
 participant in the development intelligent semi-active car suspension;
 one of the inventors apparatus for artificial lung ventilation based on electro-pneumatic PID controller;
 developed software and hardware interfaces for fuzzy CPU together with ST Microelectronics (Italy-France) and fuzzy control system intelligent mobile robot.

Science achievements 
He published more than 40 books and 250 papers in periodical journals and proceedings of conferences in different scientific domains.
He is inventor of more than 30 patents (robust intelligent control and quantum soft computing) published in USA, EU, Japan and China.

Notes 
 
 S. V. Ulyanov on PronetLabs website.
 S. V. Ulyanov on International University of Nature, Society and Man «Dubna» website.

1946 births
Living people
Russian engineers